A list of film directors and DVD movies directors who work in the Cinema of Burma:

A
Aung Pwint

K
Kyaw Thu
Kyi Soe Htun
Kyi Phyu Shin

L
Lu Min

M
Maung Maung Ta
Maung Wunna
Midi Z
Myint Aung

S
Sein Lyan Htun

T
Thu Kha
Tin Maung

W
Win Oo
Wyne (Own Creator)

Z
Zarganar
Zin Yaw Maung Maung

References

Burmese film directors
Burma
Film directors